Folsomia is a genus of elongate-bodied springtails in the family Isotomidae. There are more than 110 described species in Folsomia.

Species
 Folsomia candida
 Folsomia fimetaria
 Folsomia fimetarioides
 Folsomia prima
 Folsomia quadrioculata

References

Further reading

External links

 

Collembola
Articles created by Qbugbot
Springtail genera